Ayhan Işık (born Ayhan Işıyan; 5 May 1929 – 16 June 1979) was one of the pioneers of Turkish cinema and actors in Turkey, and among the most famous Turkish leading actors in the 1950s and 1960s.

Biography
Ayhan Işık was born Ayhan Işıyan on 5 May 1929 in the Konak district of İzmir. He was the youngest of six children. He lost his father when he was just six years old. In his posthumously published memoirs, Işık described his father as follows: "The most significant thing I remember about him is the way he smelled. I loved his hugging me before I went to bed. Once he took me fishing and carried me on his back on our way home since I was exhausted. That is all I can remember about him. I have always tried to force myself to remember more of him; unfortunately I couldn't."

He attended school in İzmir and Istanbul, where they moved after Işık's elder brother attended university. He liked going to school. He once noted that his teachers in high school included such significant writers of Turkish literature as Mahir İz, Salah Birsel and Rıfat Ilgaz. He was a sociable boy and made many friends in Istanbul. Some of his friends from school became important individuals as well.

After high school, Işık attended the painting department of the State Fine Arts Academy. He was a good painter and he joined a group of young painters who called themselves "The Ten," since they were then fellow painters. Their goal was to create a synthesis of Eastern and Western values in the medium of painting while one of their secondary intentions was to make close contact with the art of the common man, a goal he would achieve later as an actor.

Işık took first place in the contest, and his film career began. He first played the leading role in a historical film called "Yavuz Sultan Selim ve Yeniçeri Hasan" (Selim I and Janissary Hasan) directed by Orhan Murat Arıburnu. After that, Işık met Ömer Lütfi Akad and the two made a film series called "İngiliz Kemal" (English Kemal), which was an action thriller.

In 1952, Akad directed a very significant film called "Kanun Namına" (In the Name of the Law), in which Işık played the leading role mutually with Gülistan Güzey, the femme fatale of Turkish cinema in the 1950s. The film was an extraordinary drama about ordinary people, which brought the film great success. People loved the film, but they loved the young leading actor, Ayhan Işık, more.

Film after film, year after year, Işık's fame grew. People wanted to see him. Osman Seden, his producer at that time, says that Işık began working in the films produced by Seden for TL 1,000 in the early 1950s, while he would be paid TL 100,000 in the early 1960s.

However, Ayhan Işık was not satisfied with his lot and visited many countries including Italy and Iran in order to find new possibilities and contacts to market Turkish films. Though paid at the highest level in Turkey, Işık's average fee for a hit film was less than one-10th of the fee paid to a leading actor in the U.S.

The film Bitter Life, directed by Metin Erksan, was a second triumph for Işık. This was again a dramatic and bloody love story, which would become a trademark for Işık's movies.

Star-cinema loves actor-actress pairings. Though Işık worked with most of the best leading actresses of his time, his films with Belgin Doruk occupy a special place. People adored both as if they were a real and perfect couple. The "Küçükhanım" (Mademoiselle) film series was the outcome of this pairing and all were box-office hits. The pair made 11 films in a row.

Akad and some film critics said that Işık's best role was in the "Küçükhanım" series, which were romantic comedy films.

Işık's films with Türkan Şoray provided a different kind of pairing. The two worked together in "Acı Hayat," 1962 and "Otobüs Yolcuları" (Bus Passengers), 1961. Neither had a happy ending and both were realistic. "Otobüs Yolcuları" was a political thriller while "Bitter Life" was a social drama.

Death

Işık died in 1979 at the age of 50 from heart attack, which shocked his family, friends and fans. He was known for his disciplined and calm living free from any scandals. He lived a kingly life as much as the social and economic conditions of the filmmaking business allowed him to, and died as "the king without a crown," as the press used to call him.

Filmography

 1951 - Yavuz Sultan Selim ve Yeniçeri Hasan
 1952 - İngiliz Kemal Lawrence`e Karşı ~ Ahmet Esat/İngiliz Kemal
 1952 - Kanun Namına ~ Nazım Usta
 1953 - Kanlı Para
 1953 - Katil ~ Kemal
 1953 - Vahşi Arzu
 1953 - Öldüren sehir ~ Ali
 1954 - Vahşi Bir Kız Sevdim ~ Yüzbaşı Adil
 1954 - Şimal Yıldızı
 1955 - Kardeş Kurşunu  ~ Orhan
 1956 - İntikam Alevi
 1957 - Bir Avuç Toprak
 1958 - Beraber Ölelim
 1958 - Meçhul Kahramanlar ~ Osman
 1960 - Ölüm Peşimizde
 1960 - Devlerin Öfkesi
 1960 - Kanlı Firar
 1960 - Yangın Var (Eski İstanbul Kabadayıları) ~ Murat
 1961 - Otobüs Yolcuları ~ Otobüs Şoförü Kemal
 1961 - Avare Mustafa
 1961 - Ya O Ya Ben
 1961 - Küçük Hanımefendi
 1961 - Tatlı Günah
 1961 - Aşktan da Üstün
 1961 - Sevimli Haydut
 1962 - Üç Tekerlekli Bisiklet ~ Ali
 1962 - Küçük Hanım Avrupa`da ~ Ömer
 1962 - Zorlu Damat ~ Necdet/Hasan
 1962 - Acı Hayat ~ Mehmet
 1962 - Allah Seviniz Dedi
 1962 - Küçük Hanımın Şöförü
 1962 - Çifte Nikah
 1962 - Küçük Hanımın Kısmeti
 1962 - Rıfat Diye Biri ~ Rıfat
 1962 - Belalı Torun
 1963 - Bahriyeli Ahmet ~ Bahriyeli Ahmet
 1963 - Şaşkın Baba
 1963 - İlk Göz Ağrısı ~ Turgut
 1963 - Şıpsevdi
 1963 - Küçük Beyin Kısmeti
 1963 - İki Kocalı Kadın
 1963 - Kırık Anahtar
 1963 - Helal Olsun Ali Abi
 1963 - Maceralar Kralı
 1963 - Yavaş Gel Güzelim
 1963 - Yaralı Aslan
 1963 - Ayşecik Canımın İçi
 1964 - Kral Arkadaşım
 1964 - Hızlı Yaşayanlar
 1964 - Kanun Karşısında
 1964 - Muhteşem Serseri
 1964 - Öp Annemin Elini
 1964 - Kadın Terzisi
 1964 - Halk Çocuğu
 1964 - Katilin Kızı
 1964 - Koçum Benim
 1964 - Taşralı Kız ~ Necmi
 1964 - Hızır Dede
 1964 - Şahane Züğürtler
 1964 - Kadın Berberi ~ Erol
 1964 - Şoförler Kralı
 1965 - Fişek Necmi
 1965 - Namusum İçin
 1965 - Sevinç Gözyaşları
 1965 - Sonsuz Geceler
 1965 - Yasak Cennet
 1965 - Kadın İsterse
 1965 - Güneşe Giden Yol
 1965 - Kolejli Kızın Aşkı ~ Ayhan
 1965 - Tamirci Parçası ~ Demir
 1965 - Sayılı Dakikalar
 1965 - Şoförün Kızı
 1966 - Allahaısmarladık İstanbul
 1966 - Vur Emri ~ Ali
 1966 - Kanun Benim
 1966 - İdam Mahkumu ~ Ahmet
 1966 - İstanbul Dehşet İçinde ~ Kemal
 1966 - Siyah Otomobil
 1966 - Altın Kollu Adam
 1966 - Katiller de Ağlar
 1966 - Kumarbazın İntikamı
 1966 - Aslan Pençesi
 1966 - Bıçaklar Fora
 1967 - Demir Bilek
 1967 - Yalnız Adam
 1967 - Küçük Hanımefendi ~ Bülent
 1967 - Büyük Kin
 1967 - Krallar Ölmez ~ Ajan Murat
 1967 - Ölüm Saati
 1967 - Kızıl Tehlike
 1967 - Beni Katil Ettiler
 1967 - Aslan Yürekli Kabadayı
 1967 - Gecelerin Kralı
 1967 - Galatalı Mustafa
 1967 - Acı Günler ~ Turgut
 1967 - Yıkılan Gurur
 1968 - Erikler Çiçek Açtı
 1969 - Sevdiğim Adam
 1969 - Sabah Olmasın
 1969 - Ayşecik Yuvanın Bekçileri ~ Murat
 1969 - Yılan Soyu
 1969 - Tel Örgü
 1969 - Fato ~ Yüzbaşı Kemal
 1969 - Cingöz Recai
 1969 - Yuvanın Bekçileri
 1969 - Hayatımın Erkeği
 1969 - Karlıdağ`daki Ateş
 1970 - Yaşamak Kolay Değil
 1970 - Küçük Hanımın Şoförü
 1970 - Gölgedeki Adam ~ Ekrem
 1970 - Ölünceye Kadar ~ Nejat
 1970 - Zindandan Gelen Mektup
 1970 - Şampiyon
 1970 - Öleceksek Ölelim ~Akmeşeli Dinar
 1970 - Dağların Kartalı
 1970 - Çalınmış Hayat
 1970 - Bütün Aşklar Tatlı Başlar
 1971 - Şerefimle Yaşarım ~ Murat
 1971 - Herşeyim Sensin
 1971 - Ölümden Korkmuyorum
 1971 - Fatoş Sokakların Meleği
 1971 - Sezercik Yavrum Benim ~ Tarık
 1971 - Beyoğlu Kanunu ~Vedat
 1972 - Büyük Bela
 1972 - Kanun Adamı
 1972 - Kırık Merdiven ~ Kemal
 1972 - Kader Yolcuları
 1972 - Beyaz Kurt
 1972 - Oğlum
 1972 - Yirmi Yıl Sonra ~ Nazım
 1973 - Kızın Varsa Derdin Var
 1973 - Kara Haydar  ~ Haydar
 1973 - Ölümün Nefesi (La Mano che Nutre La Morte) ~ Doktor İgor
 1974 - The Hand That Feeds the Dead
 1974 - Lover of the Monster
 1975 - Haşhaş
 1975 - Harakiri
 1976 - Örgüt
 1976 - Kana Kan
 1977 - Yangın
 1979 - Ölüm Benimdir

References

 Türk Sineması (Turkish Movie Database) - Ayhan Işık biography

External links
 
 Yeşilçam Street Online - Ayhan Işık 

1929 births
1979 deaths
Turkish male film actors
Actors from İzmir
Burials at Zincirlikuyu Cemetery
20th-century Turkish male actors